Kirk Baumgartner (born November 3, 1967) is an American football player.  He is the fourth son to James and Patricia Baumgartner. He joined brothers Brian, Brad, and Kevin. Another son, Keith, was born later. Baumgartner attended Colby High School and went on to attend University of Wisconsin–Stevens Point.   

At UW–Stevens Point, Baumgartner was a three-time First Team NAIA All-American, and arguably the best quarterback in National Association of Intercollegiate Athletics history. He is currently the leader in passing yards, with 14,847 yards in his career. Baumgartner also was a two-time NAIA National Player of the Year. He participated in the Senior Bowl before being drafted. 

In 1987, Baumgartner led UW-Stevens Point to a NAIA National Championship, but the season was forfeited later due to use of an ineligible athlete. 

He still holds many records in the Wisconsin Intercollegiate Athletic Conference (WIAC). He currently leads all of these categories:

Passes Attempted: 1,949Passes Completed: 997Passing Yards: 14,847Passing Touchdowns: 122Total Offensive Attempts: 2,320Total Offensive Yards: 14,553

Baumgartner was also a three-time First Team All-WIAC pick, and was twice named WIAC Player of the Year.

Baumgartner was drafted in the ninth round of the 1990 NFL Draft by the Green Bay Packers. He was elected to the College Football Hall of Fame in 2005. He also was inducted into the UW-Stevens Point Hall of Fame in 2001.

References

1967 births
Living people
American football quarterbacks
College Football Hall of Fame inductees
Wisconsin–Stevens Point Pointers football players
People from Colby, Wisconsin